Ludwig Georg Courvoisier (10 November 1843 – 8 April 1918) was a surgeon from Basel, Switzerland. He was one of the first doctors to remove gallstones from the common bile duct.

In 1890, Courvoisier published the book Casuistisch-statistische Beiträge zur Pathologie und Chirurgie der Gallenwege, a manual on biliary surgery in which he introduced the medical sign known as Courvoisier's law.

Entomology
Courvoisier was an entomologist most interested in the Lycaenidae. His entomological works include:
Courvoisier, L. G., 1910. Uebersicht über die um Basel gefundenen Lycaeniden. Verh. naturf. Ges. Basel 21: 153–164. 
Courvoisier, L. G., 1910. Entdeckungsreisen und kritische Spaziergänge ins Gebiet der Lycaeniden. Entomologische Zeitschrift 23 (18): 92–94. 
Courvoisier, L. G., 1912. Javanische Lycaeniden gesammelt von Edw. Jacobson. Tijdschr. Ent. 55: 15–19. 
Courvoisier, L. G. 1912. Ueber Zeichnungs-Aberrationen bei Lycaeniden. Deut. ent. Zeit. [Iris] 26, pp. [38-65, pls 4,5]
Courvoisier, L. G. 1916. Über Männchenschuppen bei Lycaeniden Verh. naturf. Ges. Basel 26, pp. [11-48, 2 pls]
Courvoisier, L. G., 1920. Zur Synonymie des Genus Lycaena. Deutsche Entomologische Zeitschrift (Iris) [1914] 28: 143–176; [1920] 34: 230–262. 
His butterfly collection and herbarium are held by the
Natural History Museum of Basel.

References

External links
Full text of Courvoisier's Casuistisch-statistische Beiträge zur Pathologie und Chirurgie der Gallenwege at Google Books.

1843 births
1918 deaths
Swiss surgeons
Swiss lepidopterists